Highway 966 is a provincial highway in the Canadian province of Saskatchewan. It runs from Highway 905 (former Highway 964) near Stony Rapids until a dead end near Riou Lake.

It is cut off from the rest of the province for part of the year, except in winter when a seasonal road forms along Highway 905, leading to the south.

See also
Roads in Saskatchewan
Transportation in Saskatchewan

References

966